Christine Ortiz is the dean of graduate education at the Massachusetts Institute of Technology (MIT), and Morris Cohen Professor of Materials Science and Engineering.

The goal of Ortiz's research program is a mechanistic-based understanding of tissue function, quality, and pathology. She is planning to create a new university, centered on project-based learning.

Education
BS, Rensselaer Polytechnic Institute, 1992
PhD, Cornell University, 1997

References

Living people
MIT School of Engineering faculty
Year of birth missing (living people)
Women materials scientists and engineers
Cornell University alumni
Rensselaer Polytechnic Institute alumni